Dundee Township is a civil township of Monroe County in the U.S. state of Michigan.  The population was 8,145 at the 2020 census. The township contains the village of Dundee, and the majority of the township is served by Dundee Community Schools.

Communities
Diann is the location of a junction between the Ann Arbor Railroad running north–south, the Indiana and Ohio Railway coming in from the west, and the CN Flat Rock Subdivision coming in from the east at  about three miles southeast of Dundee.
Dundee is a village within the township on the River Raisin at the junction of U.S. Route 23 and M-50.
It was founded in 1886 as a railway station. Rea had its own post office from March 2, 1886 until October 2, 1906.

Geography

Demographics
As of the census of 2000, there were 6,341 people, 2,367 households, and 1,713 families residing in the township. The racial makeup of the township was 97.35% White, 0.49% African American, 0.22% Native American, 0.35% Asian, 0.43% from other races, and 1.17% from two or more races. Hispanic or Latino of any race were 1.25% of the population. 
There were 2,367 households, out of which 36.4% had children under the age of 18 living with them, 56.7% were married couples living together, 10.7% had a female householder with no husband present, and 27.6% were non-families. 22.8% of all households were made up of individuals, and 8.7% had someone living alone who was 65 years of age or older.  The average household size was 2.67 and the average family size was 3.13.

In the township the population was spread out, with 28.2% under the age of 18, 9.4% from 18 to 24, 30.3% from 25 to 44, 22.5% from 45 to 64, and 9.6% who were 65 years of age or older.  The median age was 34 years. For every 100 females, there were 100.1 males.  For every 100 females age 18 and over, there were 95.7 males.

The median income for a household in the township was $47,279, and the median income for a family was $57,996. Males had a median income of $44,250 versus $26,580 for females. The per capita income for the township was $20,361.  About 5.6% of families and 7.7% of the population were below the poverty line, including 8.8% of those under age 18 and 5.6% of those age 65 or over.

Highways

References

External links
 Official website

Townships in Monroe County, Michigan
Townships in Michigan
Populated places established in 1838
1838 establishments in Michigan